Fred E. Allen (March 26, 1855 – August 21, 1935) was an American merchant and politician from New York.

Life 
Allen was born on March 26, 1855 in Lisle, New York, the son of James F. Allen and a descendant of Ethan Allen. He attended Whitney's Point High School.

Allen lived in Whitney's Point and commenced his merchant business in 1883. He initially clerked for J. P. Griffin and at one point had a partnership with Jesse Babcock. He began his own business with a dry goods and grocery stock in the C. H. Parsons store. He developed a successful mercantile business with one of the largest stocks in town. His brother Herbert was his business partner. He retired in 1930.

Allen served as town clerk for several years, village trustee, a board of education member for fifteen years, and president of the school board for eight years. A Republican, he was a member of the Republican County Committee. In 1901, he was elected to the New York State Assembly as a Republican, representing the Broome County 2nd District. He served in the Assembly in 1902, 1903, 1904, 1905, and 1906. He also served as secretary of the Broome County Agricultural Society for nine years and as postmaster for eight years.

Allen was a trustee of the local Baptist Church. He was a member of the Freemasons. In 1875, he married Atala Babcock. Atala died in 1910. In 1911, he married Delia Stafford Robinson.

Allen died at home on August 21, 1935, a little over a month after his wife Delia's death. He was buried in Riverside Cemetery.

References

External links 

 The Political Graveyard

1855 births
1935 deaths
People from Lisle, New York
19th-century American merchants
20th-century American politicians
School board members in New York (state)
Republican Party members of the New York State Assembly
New York (state) postmasters
American Freemasons
Baptists from New York (state)
Burials in New York (state)